Hylomantis is a genus of tree frogs, the rough leaf frogs, native to the Atlantic forest in eastern Brazil. There are two recognized species; several others formerly placed in this genus now are placed in Agalychnis.

Species

References 

 
Amphibian genera
Taxa named by Wilhelm Peters